Substantial part may refer to:

Substantial part (Canadian copyright law), concept in Canadian copyright law
Substantial part test, test in the United States tax law